Echo and Narcissus is an oil painting of 1627 and 1628 by French artist Nicolas Poussin. It measures  and is kept in the Louvre, Paris.

The myth 
The work derives from Greek Mythology. According to Ovid's Metamorphoses, the nymph Echo fell in love with Narcissus, but he rejected her. Nemesis, the goddess of vengeance, punished Narcissus by making him fall in love with his own reflection.

At the place where he died grew the flower that bears his name: Narcissus.

The painting 
Poussin illustrates this myth by representing three characters in an idyllic landscape: in the foreground, Narcissus, lying down; behind him, on the right, Eros, god of love; and on the left, sitting on a rock, Echo. Around the hair of young Narcissus are already blooming flowers to which he gave his name. Echo, leaning on a rock, seems "an elegiac and immaterial apparition".

See also 
 List of paintings by Nicolas Poussin

References

1628 paintings
Mythological paintings by Nicolas Poussin
Paintings in the Louvre by French artists
Paintings based on Metamorphoses